Cupul or Kupul, (Maya: Kupul, 'toponímico; adjective') was the name of a Maya chiefdom at time of the Spanish conquest of Yucatán. Cupul was one of the most extensive and densely populated Maya provinces on the Yucatán Peninsula. It was formed in the mid-fifteenth century after the fall of Mayapan and reached its maximum power during the sixteenth century, at the time of their own Spanish conquest led by the adelantado Francisco de Montejo. According to the Encyclopedia Yucatán in time, the Mayan voice ku-pul, means that throws the bouncing, giving a connotation referring to the Mayan ballplayers that existed in the region.

Organization
After the war between the Tutul Xiu and Cocom, the Yucatan Peninsula, broke up into 16 Kuchkabal
Conflicts between Kuchkabal were common, especially between Tutul Xiu and Cocom.

Normally each Kuchkabal had a capital where the ruler and supreme priest lived. The ruler was called a Halach Uinik . Each Kuckabal was divided into several municipalities called "Batalib" which in turn were governed by officials called " Batab "who were usually relatives of the Halach Uinik. Each Batab, was the military leader of its population.

On the religious side, after Halach Uinik, was the Ah Kin May, and the regular priests Ah Kin(meaning coming from the Sun). Also there was a sacrificial priest called "Ah Nacom".

The batalib were Panaba, Tsonot, Temozón, Cucumul, Tixcacalcupul, and Uayumhá.

History

The League of Mayapan
See The League of Mayapan

Since the tenth century, The League of Mayapan had been the main power in The Yucatan Peninsula. In 1440 the governor of Cupul, Ek Balam founded a town of the same name.

The end of the League

In 1441 the league had a civil war between the Cocom and Tutul Xiues. The rest of the league took advantage of the war, and rebelled. By 1461 The League of Mayapan had been completely disintegrated into seventeen Kuchkabals.

References
 Barrera Vásquez, Alfredo, et al. (1980), Cordemex, ed., Maya Dictionary - Spanish - Maya, Mérida, Yucatán, Mexico., P. 354, "Kupul: Yucatan province more densely populated and one of the most extensive during the Spanish conquest»
 Casares Canton, Raul; Duch Colell, Juan; Antochiw Kolpa, Michel; Fenced Zavala, Silvio; et al. (1998). Yucatán en el tiempo [Yucatán in time]. Mérida, Yucatán. pp. 362 (Vol. 2). .

Mayan chiefdoms of the Yucatán Peninsula